Magda Rusia (born 28 December 1994) is a Georgian acrobatic gymnast. With partners Mariam Gigolashvili and Nino Diasamidze, Rusia competed in the 2014 Acrobatic Gymnastics World Championships.

References

1994 births
Living people
Acrobatic gymnasts from Georgia (country)
Female acrobatic gymnasts